Peppino Gagliardi (born 25 May 1940) is an Italian singer.

Gagliardi was born in Naples. His first hit in Italy came in 1963 with "T'amo e t'amerò". In 1970, he had another big hit with the song, Settembre, and more hits followed in the early 1970s.

He achieved two-second placings at the Sanremo Music Festival: in 1972 with  "Come le viole" and in 1972 with "Come un ragazzino". His music declined in popularity in the 1980s and 1990s. His last entry at the Sanremo Music Festival was "L'alba" in 1993.

One of his songs, "Che vuole questa musica stasera", is part of the original soundtrack of Scent of a Woman by Dino Risi, The Man from U.N.C.L.E. by Guy Ritchie and The Ruthless by Renato De Maria and Welcome Home by George Ratliff. The song was also used in an episode of Season 2 of the Belgian series Professor T.

External links
 [ Allmusic.com article]
 
 Peppino Gagliardi page at Amazon.com

Italian male singers
1940 births
Living people
Musicians from Naples